An election was held on November 8, 2022, to elect 25 members to Montana's Senate. The election coincided with elections for other offices, including the U.S. House of Representatives, and state house. The primary election was held on June 7, 2022. Republicans expanded their supermajority in chamber as they did in the house.

Retirements

Democrats
District 12: Carlie Boland retired.
District 24: Mary McNally retired due to term limits.
District 33: Jennifer Pomnichowski retired due to term limits.
District 42: Jill Cohenour retired due to term limits.
District 49: Diane Sands retired due to term limits.

Republicans
District 4: Mark Blasdel retired due to term limits.
District 5: Bob Keenan retired due to term limits.
District 13: Brian Hoven retired due to term limits.
District 20: Duane Ankney retired due to term limits.
District 22: Douglas Kary retired due to term limits.
District 27: Cary Smith retired due to term limits.
District 29: David Howard retired due to term limits.
District 34: Gordon Vance retired due to term limits.

Incumbents defeated

In primaries

Democrats
District 50: Tom Steenberg lost renomination to Andrea Olsen.

In general

Democrats
District 11: Tom Jacobson defeated by Daniel Emrich.

Open seats that changed parties

Democrats 
District 12: Carlie Boland (D) was term-limited and couldn't seek re-election, seat won by Wendy McKamey (R)

Predictions

Results summary

Close races
Districts where the margin of victory was under 10%:
District 13, 3.33%
District 32, 4.6%
District 11, 5.84% gain
District 49, 8.85%
District 39 (unexpired), 9.32% gain

Summary of results by State Senate District

Detailed Results

Districts 1-22

District 1
Incumbent Republican Mike Cuffe has represented the 1st district since 2019.

District 4
Incumbent Republican Senate President Mark Blasdel has represented the 4th district since 2015. Blasdel is term-limited and can't seek re-election. State Representative John Fuller and Lee Huestis are seeking the Republican nomination.

District 5
Incumbent Republican Bob Keenan has represented the 4th district since 2015. Keenan is term-limited and can't seek re-election. Mark Noland and Rob Tracy are seeking the Republican nomination.

District 8
Incumbent Democrat Susan Webber has represented the 8th district since 2019.

District 9
Incumbent Republican Bruce Gillespie has represented the 9th district since 2019.

District 11
Incumbent Democrat Tom Jacobson has represented the 11th district since 2019.

District 12
Incumbent Democrat Carlie Boland has represented the 12th district since 2017. Boland isn't seeking re-election.

District 13
Incumbent Republican Brian Hoven has represented the 13th district since 2015. Hoven is term-limited and can't seek re-election.

District 14
Incumbent Republican Russel Tempel has represented the 14th district since 2017. Steven Chivilicek is challenging Tempel for the Republican nomination.

District 15 (Special)
Incumbent Republican Dan Bartel has represented the 15th district since his appointment on November 8, 2021.

District 19
Incumbent Republican Kenneth Bogner has represented the 19th district since 2019.

District 20
Incumbent Republican Duane Ankney has represented the 20th district since 2015. Ankney is term-limited and can't seek re-election. Geraldine Custer and Barry Usher are seeking the Republican nomination.

District 22
Incumbent Republican Douglas Kary has represented the 22nd district since 2015. Kary is term-limited and can't seek re-election.

Districts 24-50

District 24
Incumbent Democrat Mary McNally has represented the 24th district since 2015. McNally is term-limited and can't seek re-election.

District 27
Incumbent Republican Cary Smith has represented the 27th district since 2015. Smith is term-limited and can't seek re-election.

District 29
Incumbent Republican David Howard has represented the 29th district since 2015. Howard is term-limited and can't seek re-election.

District 30
Incumbent Republican John Esp has represented the 30th district since 2019.

District 32
Incumbent Democrat Pat Flowers has represented the 32nd district since 2019.

District 33
Incumbent Democrat Jennifer Pomnichowski has represented the 33rd district since 2015. Pomnichowski is term-limited and can't seek re-election.

District 34
Incumbent Republican Gordon Vance has represented the 34th district since 2015. Vance is term-limited and can't seek re-election. Shelley Vance and Bryan Donald Haysom are seeking the Republican nomination.

District 39 (Special)
Incumbent Democrat Mark Sweeney was a candidate in the Democratic primary for the Second Congressional District of Montana, but died May 6th 2022.

District 41
Incumbent Democrat Janet Ellis has represented the 41st district since 2019.

District 42
Incumbent Democrat Jill Cohenour has represented the 43rd district since 2015. Cohenour is term-limited and can't seek re-election.

District 43
Incumbent Republican Jason Ellsworth has represented the 43rd district since 2019. Joede Vanek is challenging Ellsworth in the Republican primary.

District 48
Incumbent Democrat Shane Morigeau has represented the 48th district since 2020.

District 49
Incumbent Democrat Diane Sands has represented the 49th district since 2015. Sands is term-limited and can't seek re-election. Brad Tschida and Nancy Burgoyne are seeking the Republican nomination.

District 50
Incumbent Democrat Tom Steenberg has represented the 50th district and its predecessors since his appointment in September 2021. State Representative Andrea Olsen is challenging Steenberg for the Democratic nomination.

References

2022 Montana elections
Montana Senate
November 2022 events in the United States
Montana Senate elections